Cabazon (Spanish: Cabazón) is a unincorporated community in Riverside County, California, United States. Cabazon is on the Pacific Crest Trail.
In the 21st century, the area has become a tourist stop, due to the Morongo Casino, Resort & Spa and Desert Hills Premium Outlets. The population was 2,535 during the 2010 Census. For statistical purposes, the United States Census Bureau has defined Cabazon as a census-designated place (CDP).

History
Cabazon was initially established as a settlement in the 1870s after the Southern Pacific Railroad built a railroad station there. The station was originally named Jacinto, but was renamed Cabezone after the Spanish name of a nearby Indian rancheria. The Spanish had named the latter after a chief of the Cahuilla Indians during the colonial period. He was named for his large head.

In the late 19th century, a workers' camp known as Hall's Siding, which included a hotel and dance hall, developed. It was abandoned after the railroad relocated its facilities. In 1884 a new town was laid out by the Scottish-owned Cabazon Land and Water Company, which established a fruit farm. Some lots were sold, but were later repurchased.

The large plot of land stayed intact until it was bought by a developer in 1910. The developer established a school and a post office, but was unable to attract many residents.
 
Cabazon was incorporated as a city on November 1, 1955. Under California law, incorporated cities could host cardrooms, while unincorporated areas could not. Some businessmen hoped that cardrooms would attract new residents and businesses. During the next 16 years, the city struggled with scandal, political instability, and stalled growth, as cardroom operators vied with other landowners and residents for control of the city government.

In its first seven years, a succession of 18 police chiefs and 21 City Council members served for short terms in the city. One key dispute was between residents who hoped that Cabazon could be developed as a resort city like Palm Springs to the east, versus cardroom owners who wanted to keep Cabazon's population low so that the city government's operating expenses (and their taxes) would remain low and not impinge on their profits.

In a popular tactic of small jurisdictions, the city turned then-U.S. Route 60 down Main Street into a speed trap; it raised as much as $19,000 per year by fines from speeding tickets. That revenue stream vanished when Interstate 10 was completed in California circa 1964, and US Route 60 was decommissioned. A cardroom operator sued the City Council over its attempt to raise the license fee for cardrooms. This infuriated those landowners and residents who did not profit from the city's cardrooms. They sought to shut down the city so that the cardrooms would also be forced to shut down.

On September 14, 1971, the city's electorate voted in a special election, 192 to 131 in favor of disincorporation. The election results were upheld by the state courts, and the city government disincorporated in 1972.

With changing demographics and regional economy, locals in the early 21st century have intermittently discussed reincorporating the area.

Esperanza Fire 
In late October 2006, a major arson fire started near Cabazon. California State Route 243 was renamed as the "Esperanza Firefighters Memorial Highway" to honor them.

Geography
The total area is 0.52% water. The Census Bureau definition of the area may not precisely correspond to the local understanding of the community.

Climate
According to the Köppen Climate Classification system, Cabazon has a hot desert climate, abbreviated "BWh" on climate maps.

Demographics

2010
At the 2010 census Cabazon had a population of 2,535. The racial makeup of Cabazon was 1,751 (69.1%) Caucasian (42.3% Non-Hispanic Caucasian), 135 (5.3%) African American, 90 (3.6%) Native American, 38 (1.5%) Asian, 14 (0.6%) Pacific Islander, 358 (14.1%) from other races, and 149 (5.9%) from two or more races. Hispanic or Latino of any race were 1,135 persons (44.8%).

The census reported that 2,526 people (99.6% of the population) lived in households, 9 (0.4%) lived in non-institutionalized group quarters, and no one was institutionalized.

There were 792 households, 350 (44.2%) had children under the age of 18 living in them, 317 (40.0%) were opposite-sex married couples living together, 181 (22.9%) had a female householder with no husband present, 81 (10.2%) had a male householder with no wife present. There were 81 (10.2%) unmarried opposite-sex partnerships, and 8 (1.0%) same-sex married couples or partnerships. 157 households (19.8%) were one person and 54 (6.8%) had someone living alone who was 65 or older. The average household size was 3.19. There were 579 families (73.1% of households); the average family size was 3.68.

The age distribution was 798 people (31.5%) under the age of 18, 275 people (10.8%) aged 18 to 24, 577 people (22.8%) aged 25 to 44, 674 people (26.6%) aged 45 to 64, and 211 people (8.3%) who were 65 or older. The median age was 31.4 years. For every 100 females, there were 101.0 males. For every 100 females age 18 and over, there were 94.5 males.

There were 932 housing units at an average density of 190.5 per square mile, of the occupied units 459 (58.0%) were owner-occupied and 333 (42.0%) were rented. The homeowner vacancy rate was 2.5%; the rental vacancy rate was 5.6%. 1,382 people (54.5% of the population) lived in owner-occupied housing units and 1,144 people (45.1%) lived in rental housing units.

According to the 2010 United States Census, Cabazon had a median household income of $33,333, with 22.1% of the population living below the federal poverty line.

2000
At the 2000 census there were 2,229 people, 721 households, and 511 families in the CDP. The racial makeup of the CDP was 70.9% White, 4.1% Black or African American, 4.2% Native American, 1.2% Asian, 0.2% Pacific Islander, 13.4% from other races, and 6.1% from two or more races.
Of the 721 households 37.6% had children under the age of 18 living with them, 44.2% were married couples living together, 20.8% had a female householder with no husband present, and 29.0% were non-families. 22.5% of households were one person and 9.0% were one person aged 65 or older. The average household size was 2.9 and the average family size was 3.5.

The age distribution was 30.5% under the age of 18, 10.5% from 18 to 24, 29.7% from 25 to 44, 18.7% from 45 to 64, and 10.5% 65 or older. The median age was 34 years. For every 100 females, there were 88.6 males. For every 100 females age 18 and over, there were 90.2 males.

The median household income was $20,598 and the median family income  was $24,583. Males had a median income of $29,236 versus $19,444 for females. The per capita income for the CDP was $9,068. About 28.9% of families and 32.3% of the population were below the poverty line, including 25.9% of those under age 18 and 33.1% of those age 65 or over.

Major landmarks

Roadside attraction
Claude Bell's giant dinosaur sculptures are icons of roadside America. The site features two sculptures: a 150-ton building in the shape of a larger-than-life-sized Brontosaurus (begun in 1964, completed in 1975), and a 100-ton Tyrannosaurus rex structure (built in 1981). The dinosaurs, nicknamed "Dinny" and "Mr. Rex," respectively, were installed to attract customers to Claude Bell's Wheel Inn Cafe.

Some residents grew up with them along the highway in southern California; others may remember them from various films and videos, notably in Pee-wee's Big Adventure. Developers purchased the dinosaurs in 2005 from the Bell family for $1.2 million.

Outlet shopping center
Cabazon is a stop for outlet shopping; Desert Hills Premium Outlets and Cabazon Outlets each operate outlet malls.

Native American hotel and casino
Cabazon is the territory of the federally recognized Morongo Band of Mission Indians, which have developed the Morongo Casino, Resort & Spa. Its  27-story hotel tower dominates the San Gorgonio Pass. This is one of the largest Native American casinos in the United States.

In addition, they partnered for tribal business with Arrowhead Mountain Springwater to develop a huge water-bottling facility on the eastern edge on Cabazon in 2003. Its construction earned a LEED Silver rating.

Library
The Cabazon Library, opened in 2013, is part of the Riverside County Library System, operated under contract by Library Systems and Services, LLC.

Government
In the Riverside County Board of Supervisors, Cabazon is in 5th district, Represented by Libertarian Jeff Hewitt Supervisor of the 5th district

References

External links
 Cabazon Outlets
 San Gorgonio Pass Historical Society
 Cabazon Public Library

 
Census-designated places in Riverside County, California
Former municipalities in California
1955 establishments in California
1972 disestablishments in California
Populated places disestablished in 1972